Wargaon is a village in the Kankavli taluka in Maharashtra, India.  Wargaon is noted for the temple of Kalambadevi, which, is undergoing renovation.
Pin code of Wargaon is 416801.

Villages in Sindhudurg district